Baron Inverclyde, of Castle Wemyss in the County of Renfrew, was a title in the Peerage of the United Kingdom. It was created in 1897 for the Scottish shipowner Sir John Burns, 2nd Baronet. The Baronetcy had been created in the Baronetage of the United Kingdom in 1889 for George Burns. The titles became extinct on the death without issue of the fourth Baron in 1957.

Burns of Wemyss Bay, Baronets (1889)
Sir George Burns, 1st Baronet (1795–1890)
Sir John Burns, 2nd Baronet (1829–1901) Created Baron Inverclyde

Barons Inverclyde (1897)
John Burns, 1st Baron Inverclyde (1829–1901)
George Arbuthnot Burns, 2nd Baron Inverclyde (1861–1905)
James Cleland Burns, 3rd Baron Inverclyde (1864–1919)
(John) Alan Burns, 4th Baron Inverclyde (1897–1957)

References

Book cited

Extinct baronies in the Peerage of the United Kingdom
Noble titles created in 1897